Give Out Girls is a British television sitcom created by Tony MacMurray and stand-up comedian Hatty Ashdown. It was originally meant to be broadcast on Sky Living but on 16 July 2014 it was announced that the show would now air on Comedy Central. It began broadcasting on 14 October 2014. On 13 August 2015, Kerry Howard announced on her Twitter account that the show would not return for a second series.

Plot
Give Out Girls is a sitcom about four girls (Zoe, Gemma, Marilyn and Poppy) who work in the world of promotions.

Production
Ashdown used her time spent as a promo girl as inspiration for the series. The series began filming in and around Manchester in May 2013 and is distributed internationally by BBC Worldwide.

The cast were announced in May 2013. Vickers released a statement saying "I'm so excited about doing my first comedy show. It's different to any acting I've done before. The script is hilarious, I was laughing my head off just reading it. The rest of the cast are great, we all have really good chemistry. I can't wait to get in front of the camera and start filming!"

Cast
 Kerry Howard as Marilyn, who at 29 is the eldest sales girl who is unlucky and accident-prone
 Cariad Lloyd as Poppy, a fun loving party girl
 Diana Vickers as Gemma, the youngest sales girl who is naive and slightly dimwitted
 Miranda Hennessy as Zoe, a bitchy and passive-aggressive sales girl from New Zealand 
 Tracy-Ann Oberman as Debbie, the self-absorbed, politically incorrect boss
 Ben "Doc Brown" Smith as Andy, a cool and attractive employee
 Alex Carter as Steve, a socially inept boss

Episodes

References

External links

2014 British television series debuts
2014 British television series endings
2010s British sitcoms
Comedy Central (British TV channel) original programming
English-language television shows
Television shows set in London